Mid-America Raceway was a road racing circuit, located in Wentzville, Missouri, built in 1964, and used until 1992. It hosted various SCCA races, as well as Trans-Am and IMSA GT races.

Lap records

The fastest official race lap records at Mid-America Raceway are listed as:

References

Defunct motorsport venues in the United States
Motorsport venues in Missouri
Road courses in the United States
IMSA GT Championship circuits